The Geiranger Fjord is a fjord in the Sunnmøre region of Møre og Romsdal county, Norway. It is located entirely in the Stranda Municipality.  It is a  branch off the Sunnylvsfjorden, which is a branch off the Storfjorden (Great Fjord). The small village of Geiranger is located at the end of the fjord where the Geirangelva river empties into it.

The fjord
The fjord is one of Norway's most visited tourist sites.  In 2005, it was listed as a UNESCO World Heritage Site, jointly with the Nærøyfjorden. This status was challenged by the disputed plans to build power lines across the fjord. 

A car ferry, which doubles as a sightseeing trip, is operated by Fjord1 Nordvestlandske. It runs lengthwise along the fjord between the small towns of Geiranger and Hellesylt. The fjord is scheduled to require zero-emissions ships in 2026.

Along the fjord's sides there lie a number of now-abandoned farms. Some restoration has been made by the Storfjordens venner association. The most commonly visited among these are Skageflå, Knivsflå, and Blomberg. Skageflå may also be reached on foot from Geiranger, while the others require a boat excursion. The fjord is also host to several impressive waterfalls such as Seven Sisters Falls.

Magdalene Thoresen, Henrik Ibsen's mother-in-law, said of the area:
This fjord is surrounded by some of the steepest mountains on the entire west coast. It is very narrow and has no habitable shore area, for the precipitous heights rise in sheer and rugged strata almost straight out of the water. Foaming waterfalls plunge into the fjord from jagged peaks. There are, however, a few mountain farms here, and of these one or two have such hazardous access, by paths that wind around steep precipices, and by bridges that are fixed to the mountain with iron bolts and rings, that they bear witness in a most striking way to the remarkable powers of invention which the challenges of nature have developed in man.

Waterfalls
The two most notable waterfalls in the Geiranger Fjord are Seven Sisters Falls and the Suitor (Nynorsk Friaren).  Both falls face one another across the fjord, and the Suitor is said to be trying to woo the sisters opposite.

The Bridal Veil is another waterfall in the fjord, so named because it falls delicately over one rocky edge, and when seen backlit by the sun it has the appearance of a thin veil over the rocks.

Rock slides
The Geiranger Fjord is under constant threat from the mountain Åkerneset which is about to erode into the fjord. A collapse would produce a tsunami, hitting several nearby towns including Geiranger and Hellesylt in about ten minutes.

In popular culture 
The 2015 movie The Wave (Bølgen) is based on the premise of a rock slide from the mountain Åkerneset inundating the town of Geiranger.
Frozen used the landscapes of the Geirangerfjord and Nærøyfjord as basis for the landscapes of Arendelle.

Gallery

References

External links

 
 Geiranger Tourist-Info
 Destination Geirangerfjord - Ålesund & Sunnmøre 
 Geirangerfjord - the official travel guide to Norway
 Travel information

Stranda
Fjords of Møre og Romsdal
World Heritage Sites in Norway